Good Shepherd Catholic College is a Catholic systemic coeducational secondary day school, located in Menzies, Mount Isa Queensland, Australia. Good Shepherd Catholic College caters for students from Years 8 to 12, and is closely associated with Good Shepherd Parish, Mount Isa. The school comprises two former schools, Mount Isa Catholic High School and St Kieran's College.

History
In January 1960 three Christian Brothers opened St Kieran's. They had the care for the education of the Catholic boys of Mount Isa from Grades 5 to 10. In 1965 the Sisters of St Joseph of the Sacred Heart opened San Jose College for girls. San Jose School educated girls until 1985 when it merged with Saint Kieran's College at St Kieran's site. The new co-educational school was named Mount Isa Catholic High School. The "old" San Jose premises became St. Joseph's Primary School.

See also

 Lists of schools in Queensland
 List of Christian Brothers schools
 Catholic education in Australia

References

External links
 

Educational institutions established in 1960
Catholic secondary schools in Queensland
1960 establishments in Australia
Buildings and structures in Mount Isa
Former Congregation of Christian Brothers schools in Australia
Schools in North Queensland